Fraga is a surname of Portuguese and Spanish origin.

It may refer to:

 Alex Fraga (born 1986), Brazilian footballer
 Alberto Fraga (born 1956), Brazilian police officer and politician
 Alfonso Fraga-Pérez (born 1941), Cuban attorney and diplomat
 Arminio Fraga (born 1957), Brazilian economist
 Augusto Fraga (1920-2000), Portuguese film director
 Augusto Pacheco Fraga (born 1988), Brazilian footballer
 Chico Fraga (born 1954), Brazilian footballer
 Dan Fraga (born 1973), American comic book artist
 Denise Fraga (born 1964), Brazilian actress
 Edimar Fraga (born 1986), Brazilian footballer
 Eduardo Fraga (born 1973), Brazilian martial artist
 Felipe Fraga (born 1995), Brazilian racing driver
 Igor Fraga (born 1998), Brazilian racing driver
 Javier González Fraga (born 1948), Argentine economist and businessman
 Jay Fraga (born 1972), American activist and BMX racer
 José María Robles Fraga (born 1956), Spanish politician and diplomat
 Kelly Fraga (born 1974), Brazilian Olympic volleyball player
 Luis Fraga, American political scientist
 Manuel Fraga (1922-2012), Spanish professor and politician
 Marta Fraga (born 1985), Spanish tennis player
 Miguel Ángel Fraga (born 1987), Mexican footballer
 Pedro Fraga (born 1983), Portuguese Olympic rower
 Teresa Fraga, Mexican-American teacher and activist
 Tiago Fraga (born 1981), Brazilian footballer
 Wellington Pinto Fraga (born 1982), Brazilian footballer

Fictional characters
 Belén Fraga, fictional character from Argentine telanovella Chiquititas, played by Romina Yan

Spanish-language surnames
Portuguese-language surnames